Bindu Madhavi (born 14 June 1986) is an Indian model and actress and a reality show winner, working in Tamil-language and Telugu-language cinema. After starting her acting career in Telugu, she shifted to Tamil cinema where she was part of several successful films including Kazhugu (2012), Kedi Billa Killadi Ranga (2013), Tamizhuku En Ondrai Azhuthavum (2015) and Pasanga 2 (2015). In 2022, she emerged as the title winner of the inaugural Bigg Boss Non-Stop and became the first female winner of the Bigg Boss Telugu franchise.

Early life
Bindu Madhavi was born on 14 June 1986 in Madanapalle, Andhra Pradesh. Her father was a deputy commissioner in commercial tax department, due to which, her family moved to various places including Tirupati, Nellore, Guntur, Tenali, Vijayawada and Hyderabad, before settling in Chennai, Tamil Nadu, where she did her studies. She completed her degree in Biotechnology from Vellore Institute of Technology. She has stated that she plans to pursue a Master's in Biotechnology abroad and land a job in the field later. Madhavi also had one brother, Sagar, who died in 2012.

Career

While in college, she started modelling, with her first assignment being for Saravana Stores. She had the desire to act in films but her family was strictly against her entering the film industry, with Bindu citing that her father did not speak to her for eight months and that her mother too was upset. She met celebrity photographer Venket Ram in Chennai who agreed to do a portfolio shoot for her. She stated that Venket Ram was "amazingly helpful", as he gave her advice and that he was "the closest to a godfather I have in tinsel town". She did more modelling and went on to appear in television ads and as a result of her work in a Tata Gold Tanishq advertisement, she was auditioned and selected by noted Telugu director Sekhar Kammula to act in his production, Avakai Biryani (2008), while she also landed a supporting role in Cheran's Tamil romantic drama film Pokkisham (2009). Her other release of 2009 was Bumper Offer, opposite Sairam Shankar, which was produced by noted director Puri Jagannadh.

In 2010, Bindu's first release was Om Shanti, which featured an ensemble cast of Kajal Aggarwal, Navdeep, Nikhil Siddharth and Madhavan. She then worked with producer Dil Raju for Rama Rama Krishna Krishna (2010) alongside Ram and Arjun, where she portrayed a village-based girl. She was later signed by director Gautham Vasudev Menon for his production Veppam (2011) that was directed by his associate Anjana Ali Khan, and featured her in the role of a sex worker. The film earned mixed reviews but critics praised Bindu's performance, with a reviewer from Rediff.com stating she "does very well and manages to engage our interest". After Veppam, Bindu shifted her focus to the Tamil industry as she received more Tamil film offers. Her next Tamil release was Sathyasiva's Kazhugu (2012), a success at the box office. Likewise, her next three releases, the comedy films Kedi Billa Killadi Ranga (2013), Desingu Raja (2013) and Varuthapadatha Valibar Sangam (2013) were also commercially successful films. She stated that Kazhugu and Kedi Billa Killadi Ranga were "two films that changed my life".

Her first 2014 release was Chimbu Deven's Oru Kanniyum Moonu Kalavaniyum, in which she played Malar, the protagonist's friend. She said that she was given the option to choose between the roles of the protagonist's friend or his lover and chose the former as she felt "there was more scope to act". In 2015, she experienced further box office success with Tamizhuku En Ondrai Azhuthavum, but the romantic comedy Savaale Samaali did not fare as well. She was then cast by Pandiraj for the second time in Suriya's home production, Pasanga 2 (2015), where she portrayed the mother of a young child. The film opened to critical and commercial acclaim, with Bindu's performance being appreciated. She later worked on films including the horror comedy Jackson Durai (2016) and the village drama Pakka (2018), opposite Vikram Prabhu.

In 2017, Bindu took part in the Tamil reality show, Bigg Boss hosted by Kamal Haasan and entered the show on day 35, finishing in fifth place. Post her appearance on the show, Bindu attracted more work for commercials, films, and promotional events. She is currently working on film projects including Pagaivanuku Arulvai and Mayan.

In 2022, Bindu Madhavi entered the digital version of Bigg Boss Telugu, titled Bigg Boss Non-Stop and emerged as its title winner, thus becoming the first female winner of the Bigg Boss Telugu franchise.

Filmography

Film 
All shows are in Tamil unless otherwise noted.

Television 
{| class="wikitable sortable"
|-
! Year !! Title !! Role !! Language !! Platform!!class="unsortable" | Notes !! class="unsortable" | 
|-
|2007-2011 
| Magal || Uncredited Role|| Tamil || Sun TV||First TV debut||
|-
|2017 
|Bigg Boss (Tamil season 1)
|Contestant 
| Tamil 
| Star Vijay
|Evicted day 96
|
|-
|2020
|Mastis
|Gowri
|Telugu
|Aha
|
|
|-
|2022
|Bigg Boss Non-Stop (season 1) 
|Contestant 
| Telugu 
|Hotstar
|style="background:#73FB76;"|
||
|
|-
|2023
|Anger Tales
|
|Telugu
|Disney+ Hotstar
|
|
|-
|2023
|Newsense
|
|Telugu
|Aha
|
}

References

External links
 
 
 

Actresses in Telugu cinema
Bigg Boss (Tamil TV series) contestants
Living people
Actresses in Tamil cinema
Indian film actresses
21st-century Indian actresses
People from Chittoor district
Actresses from Andhra Pradesh
Female models from Andhra Pradesh
Vellore Institute of Technology alumni
1986 births
Telugu actresses